The Wulik River is a stream, about  long, in the northwestern part of the U.S. state of Alaska. Originating in the De Long Mountains in the North Slope Borough, it flows southwest to Kivalina Lagoon in the Chukchi Sea, east of Kivalina. It heads in the De Long Mountains, which is 5 miles (8 km) north of Sheep Mountain, and it is 42 miles (67 km) northwest of Noatak.

In 1886, a United States Navy lieutenant reported the Inuit name of this river as "Woleek."

See also
List of rivers of Alaska

References

External links
Umiak Bend

Rivers of Alaska
Rivers of North Slope Borough, Alaska
Rivers of Northwest Arctic Borough, Alaska
Drainage basins of the Chukchi Sea
Watersheds of Alaska